Eunoe spinulosa is a scale worm described from the North Atlantic Ocean off Nova Scotia.

Description
Number of segments 49; elytra 15 pairs. No distinct pigmentation pattern remaining, chaetae brass-colored. Prostomium anterior margin comprising a pair of acute anterior projections. Lateral antennae inserted ventrally (beneath prostomium and median antenna). Elytra marginal fringe of papillae present. Notochaetae distinctly thicker than neurochaetae. Bidentate neurochaetae absent.

References

Phyllodocida